Yaylakonak can refer to:

 Yaylakonak, Adıyaman
 Yaylakonak, Alanya
 Yaylakonak, Hınıs